Jennifer Carroll "Jen" Goldsack (born July 12, 1982, in Wimbledon, London) is an American rower. She competed at the 2008 Summer Olympics in the Women's Lightweight Double Sculls, and studied at Somerville College, Oxford.

References 

 
 

1982 births
Living people
People from Wimbledon, London
Olympic rowers of the United States
Rowers at the 2008 Summer Olympics
Rowers at the 2011 Pan American Games
Alumni of Somerville College, Oxford
World Rowing Championships medalists for the United States
American female rowers
Pan American Games gold medalists for the United States
Pan American Games medalists in rowing
Medalists at the 2011 Pan American Games
21st-century American women